Thilan Nipuna Walallawita (born 23 June 1998) is an English cricketer. Walallawita was born in Colombo, Sri Lanka and survived the Boxing Day Tsunami in 2004. In March 2022, he was granted British Citizenship, making him a home-registered player ahead of the 2022 domestic season in England.

He made his first-class debut on 1 August 2020, for Middlesex in the 2020 Bob Willis Trophy. He made his Twenty20 debut 20 September 2020, for Middlesex in the 2020 t20 Blast. He made his List A debut on 25 July 2021, for Middlesex in the 2021 Royal London One-Day Cup.

References

External links
 

1998 births
Living people
Cricketers from Colombo
English cricketers
Middlesex cricketers
English people of Sri Lankan descent
Sri Lankan emigrants to the United Kingdom